William de la Cornere (fl. 1294), was an English politician.

He was a Member (MP) of the Parliament of England for Derby in 1294.

References

Year of birth missing
Year of death missing
English MPs 1294